The Passion According to G.H. is a Brazilian drama film directed by Luiz Fernando Carvalho, based on the novel of the same name by Clarice Lispector. The film is going to be released by the end of 2020, in celebration for the 100th anniversary of the birth of the author Clarice Lispector.

Plot
The Passion According to G.H. depicts the story of a woman who takes an existential dive after killing a cockroach in the maid's room. Identified only by the initials G.H., she dismisses the maid and decides to do general cleaning in the service room, which she supposes is filthy and full of uselessness. After recovering from the frustration of having found a clean and tidy room, G.H. comes across a cockroach on the closet door. After the fright, she overcomes the disgust for the insect so she can kill it and taste its white interior.

Narrated in the first person, it shows the process of loss of G.H's individuality. The next day she deals with her own impotence to describe the episode. The story is organized into chapters of systematic sequence - each begins with the same sentence that serves as a closure to the previous one. Thus, interruption is an element of continuity, in a symbolic representation of what G.H's experience is. Written in 1964, the novel is considered by the literary critics to be the most important work of the author Clarice Lispector.

Cast
Maria Fernanda Cândido – G.H.

Production
The Passion According to G.H. is the second feature film by filmmaker Luiz Fernando Carvalho after the award-winning To the Left of the Father (2001), also a cinematographic version of a classic of Brazilian literature. It was during the editing of "Lavoura Arcaica" that Luiz Fernando Carvalho had contact with G.H. - the central novel of Clarice Lispector's work. Throughout his career, Luiz Fernando Carvalho directed several TV productions based on literature, such as Os Maias, by Eça de Queiroz (2001); Capitu, by Machado de Assis (2005); A Pedra do Reino, by Ariano Suassuna (2007); Dois Irmãos, by Milton Hatoum (2017); and the mini-series Correio Feminino (2013), inspired by chronicles written by Clarice Lispector in the 1950s and 1960s.

Filming
The Passion According to G.H. was filmed entirely in a penthouse of the neighborhood of Copacabana, Rio de Janeiro.

References

External links

2020 drama films
2020 films
Brazilian drama films
Films based on works by Clarice Lispector
Films directed by Luiz Fernando Carvalho